From Laramie to London is a 1917 short comedy film featuring Harold Lloyd.

Cast
 Harold Lloyd as Lonesome Luke
 Snub Pollard 
 Bebe Daniels 
 W.L. Adams
 Billy Fay
 Bud Jamison
 Fred Jefferson
 Margaret Joslin
 Marie Mosquini
 Fred C. Newmeyer
 Gilbert Pratt
 Charles Stevenson
 Dorothea Wolbert

See also
 Harold Lloyd filmography

References

External links

1917 films
Silent American comedy films
1917 short films
American silent short films
American black-and-white films
1917 comedy films
Lonesome Luke films
American comedy short films
1910s American films